Astrit Leka (born 21 December 1924) is an Albanian-born Swiss author and professor.

Life 
As a former fighter during LANÇ, after the ordeal he had gone through in the regime of the communist dictatorship, he left his family for immigration with an American visa obtained in Bern. In New York, the dean of the Faculty of Law of UNY, after seeing the qualification documents of Professor Astrit, even though he is 65 years old, offered him the position of polyglot bibliographer in the Faculty.

In Switzerland, he set himself the task of fighting for the pluralism and democratization of Albania, the national liberation of the Albanians in the former Yugoslavia, without being dependent on any embassy, any political grouping or the play of various agencies, while maintaining his integrity and independence.

In 1992, he created the non-governmental organization the International Solidarity Association for the Development of Eastern Countries "Solidest", assisted by deputies of Geneva, the head of the cantonal government, other personalities and important Swiss and foreign non-governmental associations.

In the international colloquium in 1992 for South-Eastern Europe where all delegations spoke for the non-dissolution of Yugoslavia to prevent a Balkan War, he declared that if this happens, the conflict will remain within the borders of Yugoslavia. History gave the right to Astrit and the minister of Kosovo who managed to enter this meeting, at least for one day. Astrit also enabled the introduction of Rugova's government in the Krans Montana Forum, according to the statement given by the Minister of Information of Kosovo; the preparation of materials for the defense at the UN for the issue of the imprisonment of Ukshin Hoti, etc.

Personal life 
He married Emine Leka until her death in 2021. He resides in Switzerland.

References 

1924 births
Living people
Albanian writers
20th-century Albanian writers
World War II resistance members
Albanian people of World War II
Albanian resistance members